Different for Girls, Leslie Mills' debut album, was released in 2003 on Atlantic Records. The song Good Life was included on the soundtrack for the film, What A Girl Wants.

Track listing
Different for Girls
Walk Along
Violet
Swim
Be My Water
Radiowave
Making My Way
Good Life
Rule the World
I Can't Wait
Ready to Rain
Far from All the Tears
Wings [Worldwide Bonus Track]
Circles Around The Sun [Japan Bonus Track]

References

2003 debut albums
Albums produced by David Kahne
Albums produced by John Shanks